A Factory Sample is a 7-inch double sampler EP released in January 1979 by Factory Records of Manchester, England. Funded by a small inheritance which had recently been bequeathed to Tony Wilson, it was the first vinyl recording to be released by the label (FAC 1 was a concert at The Factory). The cover of the EP is made of rice paper, dyed silver and sealed inside a thin plastic bag.

The Joy Division tracks were later re-released on the band's 1988 compilation album Substance.

The Cabaret Voltaire tracks were later re-released on the 1990 double disc rarities compilation Listen Up With Cabaret Voltaire.

Track listing
2x7" vinyl (Factory FAC 2) 
Side A (Aside)
Joy Division: "Digital" (Curtis, Hook, Morris, Sumner) – 2:50
Joy Division: "Glass" (Curtis, Hook, Morris, Sumner) – 3:51
Vinyl etching: EVERYTHING

Side B (Beside)
The Durutti Column: "No Communication" (The Durutti Column) – 4:57
The Durutti Column: "Thin Ice (Detail)" (The Durutti Column) – 3:16
Vinyl etching: IS REPAIRABLE

Side C (Seaside)
John Dowie: "Acne" (Dowie) – 1:43
John Dowie: "Idiot" (Dowie) – 1:53
John Dowie: "Hitler's Liver" (Dowie) – 2:27
Vinyl etching: EVERYTHING

Side D (Decide)
Cabaret Voltaire: "Baader Meinhof" (Cabaret Voltaire) – 3:15
Cabaret Voltaire: "Sex in Secret" (Cabaret Voltaire) – 3:28
Vinyl etching: IS BROKEN

Credits

Joy Division
Ian Curtis – lead vocals
Peter Hook – bass
Stephen Morris – drums
Bernard Sumner – guitar

The Durutti Column
Colin Sharp – lead vocals
Vini Reilly – guitar
Dave Rowbotham – guitar
Tony Bowers – bass
Chris Joyce – drums
Stephen Hopkins – keyboards

Cabaret Voltaire
Stephen Mallinder – vocals, bass, keyboards
Richard H. Kirk – guitars, keyboards, tapes
Chris Watson – keyboards, tapes

References

1978 EPs
Albums produced by Martin Hannett
Sampler albums
Factory Records EPs
Factory Records compilation albums
Post-punk EPs